Samuel Charles Havrilak (born December 13, 1947) is a former American football running back who played in the National Football League (NFL) from 1969 to 1974. He attended Monessen High School near Pittsburgh. Havrilak earned a Super Bowl ring in January 1971 at Super Bowl V. Havrilak owns the distinction of being the first player in NFL history to complete a pass, catch a pass and take a handoff in a Super Bowl.

College career
Havrilak played college football at Bucknell University, where he was named to the All-Pennsylvania Team and MVP of the Middle Atlantic Conference as a senior.  Havrilak holds the Bucknell University record for total offense with 397 yards against Colgate in 1968. He was elected to the Bucknell Hall of Fame, Class of 1981.

Professional career
His professional career was spent with both the Baltimore Colts, where he was drafted in the 8th round and played for 5 years. He was traded to the New Orleans Saints in 1974, where he finished his career.

Sam Havrilak was inducted into the Pennsylvania State Sports Hall of Fame in November 2012.

Personal life
Havrilak is currently a dentist who practices and resides in Baltimore County, Maryland.  Sam and his wife Terry have one son, Michael and a daughter-in-law, Maria del Mar Navarro, and a granddaughter Ana Sofía. Sam is an uncle of Maryland State Delegate Eric Bromwell.

References

External links
 Link to Practice

1947 births
Living people
People from Monessen, Pennsylvania
Players of American football from Pennsylvania
American football defensive backs
American football running backs
American football wide receivers
Bucknell Bison football players
Baltimore Colts players
New Orleans Saints players